Protomicarea is a genus of lichen-forming fungi in the family Psoraceae. The genus contains two species: Protomicarea limosa (the type) and Protomicarea alpestris. Protomicarea was circumscribed by lichenologist Josef Hafellner in 2001.

Species
Protomicarea alpestris 
Protomicarea limosa

References

Lecanorales
Lichen genera
Lecanorales genera
Taxa named by Josef Hafellner
Taxa described in 2001